Björn Palmquist is a retired Swedish sailor. In 1975 he won the world title in the Dragon class, competing alongside his father Bengt and brother Johan.

References

Date of birth unknown
Living people
Swedish male sailors (sport)
Year of birth missing (living people)